Count Henrik of Monpezat (born Prince Henrik of Denmark; born 4 May 2009) is a member of the Danish royal family. He is the third and youngest son of Prince Joachim and the only son of his second wife, Princess Marie. Henrik is ninth in the line of succession to the Danish throne.

Biography
Henrik was born a prince of Denmark on 4 May 2009 at Rigshospitalet, the Copenhagen University Hospital in Copenhagen. He has two older half-brothers from his father's first marriage, Nikolai and Felix, and a younger sister, Athena.

As per Danish royal tradition, his names were not revealed until his christening, which took place on 26 July 2009 at Møgeltønder Church, where his older brother Felix was also christened. At his christening, he received the names Henrik Carl Joachim Alain. His godparents are his paternal aunt, the Crown Princess of Denmark; his maternal uncles, Charles Cavallier and Benjamin Grandet; his mother's lady-in-waiting, Britt Davidsen Siesbye; as well as family friend, Christian Scherfig.

On 11 August 2015, he started school at Sct. Joseph Søstrenes Skole – a Catholic private school in Ordrup. In 2019, when he and his family moved to France, he was enrolled at the private school EIB Monceau in the 8th arrondissement of Paris.

Titles and styles
Henrik was styled as "His Highness Prince Henrik of Denmark, Count of Monpezat" until 1 January 2023. Queen Margrethe II removed the princely titles of the descendants of her son Joachim as of that date. He is known as "His Excellency Count Henrik of Monpezat". He and Prince Joachim's other children maintain their places in the order of succession.

References

External links
 Official website

|-

Danish princes
House of Monpezat
Royal children
2009 births
Living people
Counts of Monpezat
Danish people of French descent